These are all the international matches played by Pakistan national field hockey from 1970 to 1979.

Competitive record

Results

1970

1971

1972

1973

1974

1975

1976

1978

1979

Head-to-head record 

Field hockey in Pakistan
1970s in Pakistani sport